The Under 17 Female Clubs European Rink Hockey Tournament is an annual roller hockey competition for the under-17 club and national teams of Europe organised by World Skate Europe - Rink Hockey. 
The current champions are Cerdanyola CH, who completed the European championship with a series of victories to lift the Quima Jimeno Cup at Paco Arpide.

Results

See also
 World Skate Europe - Rink Hockey

References

Women's roller hockey